Little Howard's Big Question is a 2009–11 children's edutainment programme starring Howard Read as Big Howard and his six-year-old animated friend, Little Howard. The programme was first broadcast on 8 January 2009, running for a series of 13 episodes. Series 2 began airing on 6 October 2010, and series 3 began on 18 May 2011.

Format
Animated boy Little Howard and his live-action guardian Big Howard live together in Purley, London. Each episode typically begins with a short comedy sketch, which inspires Little Howard to blow a loud animated klaxon and ask a "big question" on a related topic. After a credit sequence involving an animated monkey song-and-dance routine, the remainder of the programme investigates possible answers to the big question, using a combination of research, expert advice, fantasy, and song.

Further assistance is provided by Mother, a pink (series 1) or orange (series 2/3) anthropomorphic personal computer that wears clothes and feels emotions.

Although the programme is broadcast on the BBC, which does not show commercial advertising, each episode features a comedy "advertising break" with imaginary products vaguely related to the big question. Similarly, a frequent element throughout the series is the use of humorous pop culture references to appeal to an adult audience, and which would fly over younger viewers' heads.

Awards
On 16 November 2011, the episode Why do Things Have to Die? from series 2 won a Writers' Guild of Great Britain award for Best Children's Television Script.

List of episodes

Series 1
Series 1 began airing on 8 January 2009. Performers who appeared in series 1 included: Kirsten O'Brien, Lucy Porter, Justin Edwards, Ishia Bennison, and David Penn.

Series 2
Series 2 began airing on 6 October 2010. The first two episodes were shown on BBC Two (because the 2010 Commonwealth Games were being aired on BBC One), and the rest of the series on BBC One. The series introduced many new characters, real and cartoon, including Little Howards "Sort-of half-brother, kind-of" Little Albert. Actors who appeared in series 2 included David Schneider, Sy Thomas, Lucy Porter, Siân Lloyd, Jarred Christmas, Tim Brooke-Taylor, Marek Larwood, Barney Harwood, and Andre Vincent. Helen Lederer featured in more than one episode as Big Howard's Mum.

Series 3
Series 3 began airing on 18 May 2011. Actors who appeared in series 3 included: Rusty Goffe, Ben Moor, Daniel Hill, Chris Cox, Doc Brown, Trevor Neal, and Thomas Nelstrop.

References

External links
Official website at www.littlehoward.co.uk

BBC children's television shows
British children's comedy television series
British television series with live action and animation
2010s British television series
2009 British television series debuts